Boots Ryan Cayubit (born 7 June 1991) is a Filipino professional road bicycle racer, who currently rides for UCI Continental team . He is also a gold medalist at the 2016 World University Cycling Championship held in Tagaytay by winning the men's criterium event by points.

Personal life
As of March 2016, Cayubit is attending St. Clare College of Caloocan as a sophomore student taking up a course on Business Administration.

Major results
2015
 8th Overall Tour of Borneo
2016
 1st  Criterium, World University Cycling Championships

References

External links

Filipino male cyclists
Living people
1991 births